Rui Jorge Monteiro Mendes (born 10 November 1999) is a Portuguese professional footballer who plays as a winger for FC Emmen in the Eredivisie.

Early life
From Gondor, in Amarante, Portugal, Mendes moved at the age of seven to Dissen, Lower Saxony with his family. He was in the youth academy of Arminia Bielefeld but was not offered a professional contract. Instead he joined up with 1899 Hoffenheim aged 18 on a two-year contract. He trained with the first team under Julian Nagelsmann and played for their second team before ultimately leaving on a free transfer in 2021.

Career
During a trial game for FC Emmen Mendes scored twice against Heracles Almelo to earn a contract.

In the 2021-22 season, Mendes was instrumental in FC Emmen’s championship winning season in the Eerste Divisie. Mendes scored in eight consecutive games, just one short of the all time FC Emmen record from the 2001–02 season, when Paul Weerman scored in nine consecutive matches.

Honours
Emmen
 Eerste Divisie: 2021–22

References

1999 births
Living people
Portuguese footballers
Association football wingers
Eredivisie players
Eerste Divisie players
TSG 1899 Hoffenheim II players
Arminia Bielefeld players
FC Emmen players
Portuguese expatriate footballers
Portuguese expatriate sportspeople in Germany
Expatriate footballers in Germany
Portuguese expatriate sportspeople in the Netherlands
Expatriate footballers in the Netherlands